Summer Sundae Fringe Festival (also called the Summer Sundae Fringe) was an annual music festival, running from 2006 to 2010 and  held in Leicester, England, which focused on showcasing artistic talents and communities within the city of Leicester.

It was created by Andy Black and Richard Haswell  and subsequently run and organised with the help of the Leicestershire based music forum Pineapster, who strove to organise promoters, venues, organisers and musical acts to organise and run their own events in promotion of their own talents and showcase the best of the cities talent whilst fundraising for charity.

The festival began as a one off warm up party in 2006 and grew year on year (until 2010), to a two-week showcase of musical talents, in a wide variety of venues and locations across Leicester. The fringe festival was scheduled to occur annually across the first two weeks of August each year. The fringe traditionally culminated with a series of warm up parties, across Leicester city centre, occurring on the Thursday evening before the start of the Summer Sundae Weekender event.

These warm up parties are formally titled 'Fringe Thursday', and are linked by an open top bus service, included within ticket price, which provides party goers with transport to move them from event to event. All artists appearing at Fringe Thursday events donated their time and services for free.

Tickets were sold for Fringe Thursday and had to be exchanged for a wristband to allow bus entry.

The event occurred for the last time in 2010.

Size

The 2006 warm up party sold out to 360 people. The 2010 Fringe Thursday events sold over 2500 tickets. A grand total of nearly £25,000 was raised for LOROS across the festival's five-year history.

Ethos

The Fringe Festival was run as a charity fundraiser with two main principles

1, To showcase the best in artistic talent from the city of Leicester to an outside audience

2, To raise awareness of the hospice LOROS to a new, younger generation of people.

From inception, the festival strove to exhibit local talent to a new audience. The arrival of main festival ticket holders from all over the UK provided a ready made market of people keen to explore both new music and their new location. Thus Fringe Thursday excels by providing a medium to guide tourists from outside of the county, across the city, to visit a variety of establishments and experience local musician, comedians and photographers from across Leicester.

History

2010 event & line up

The 2010 Summer Sundae Fringe Festival ran from Friday 6 August 2010 to Thursday 12 August 2010. The festival culminated in Fringe Thursday again.

2009 line up
The 2009 Summer Sundae Fringe Festival ran 3–13 August 2009. The festival culminated in Fringe Thursday, on 13 August 2009, across 9 city centre venues in Leicester. Over 2000 people attended the 2009 Fringe Thursday warm up parties.

2008 line up

2007 line up

2006 line up

The first warm up party occurred on Thursday 10 August 2006 at Firebug Bar, Millstone Lane, Leicester. 360 people sold out a capacity venue. £1560 was raised and donated to LOROS hospice

References

External links
Official Website
 eFestivals festival coverage

Leicester
Tourist attractions in Leicestershire
Music festivals in Leicestershire
Recurring events established in 2006
2006 establishments in England
Recurring events disestablished in 2010